Felix Adler may refer to:
Felix Adler (professor) (1851–1933), professor of political and social ethics, founder of the American Ethical Culture movement
Felix Adler (screenwriter) (1884–1963), film writer, known for writing many Three Stooges scripts
Felix Adler (clown) (1895–1960), long-time head clown of Ringling Brothers Circus